Okla Eugene "Oke" Smith, also known by his nickname "Oak", (February 27, 1894 – May 2, 1974) was a professional American football player who played end for two seasons and sixteen games for the Rock Island Independents. He was a first-team all pro in 1920.

References

External links
 Oke Smith's profile at NFL.com

1894 births
1974 deaths
American football ends
Drake Bulldogs football players
Rock Island Independents players
People from Schuyler County, Missouri